Namdev Jayram Sasane is an Indian politician. He was elected to the Maharashtra Legislative Assembly from Umarkhed in the 2019 Maharashtra Legislative Assembly election as a member of Bharatiya Janata Party.

References 

1971 births
Living people
Bharatiya Janata Party politicians from Maharashtra
People from Yavatmal
Maharashtra MLAs 2019–2024